Neha Khan is an Indian model and actress who works in Marathi, Malayalam and Bollywood films. She is known for playing ACP Divya Singh in Zee Marathi's TV Series Devmanus.

Early life
Neha was born in Amravati, Maharashtra in a Muslim family. In 8th grade she started participating in modelling competitions and went on to win 'Princess of Maharashtra' at the age of 15.

Career
Neha moved to Mumbai in 2014 after she received a role in the multilingual movie Bad Girl, starring Sherlyn Chopra and directed by Shajiyem. She played a model named 'Deepika' in the movie. She joined Anupam Kher's acting school and in June 2014, she was cast in a small role in the movie Uvaa. She played the role of Kamini in the Marathi movie Gurukul, which was released in August 2015.

Filmography

Films

Television

Web series 
Cyber Vaar - Har Screen Crime Scene as Asha

Music video

References

External links

Actresses in Hindi cinema
Living people
Female models from Maharashtra
Indian film actresses
Actresses from Maharashtra
Actresses in Malayalam cinema
Year of birth missing (living people)